Rudy Khairullah Bin Adi Negara (born 19 July 1994) is a Singaporean footballer who plays as a goalkeeper for Singapore Premier League club Balestier Khalsa, on loan From Lion City Sailors.

Career 

Rudy Khairullah started his career with S.League club Gombak United. He joined under-23 developmental side Courts Young Lions after Gombak United withdrew from the S.League at the end of the 2012 season.

Rudy Khairullah represented Singapore U23 at the 2014 Asian Games. He was called up to the senior team for the friendly matches against Papua New Guinea and Hong Kong on 6 September 2014 but has yet to make his international debut.

Career statistics

Others

Singapore Selection Squad
He was selected as part of the Singapore Selection squad for the 2018 Sultan of Selangor's Cup.

References 

1994 births
Living people
Singaporean footballers
Association football goalkeepers
Gombak United FC players
Singapore Premier League players
Young Lions FC players
Footballers at the 2014 Asian Games
Asian Games competitors for Singapore
Lion City Sailors FC players